Eulis Soko Richardson (December 8, 1939 – January 29, 2004) was an American rhythm and blues drummer. His career spanned almost fifty years, during which he performed and recorded with seminal groups including John Mayall's Bluesbreakers and the Ike & Tina Turner Revue. He is perhaps best known for his innovative arrangement of Ike & Tina Turner's version of the Creedence Clearwater Revival song "Proud Mary."

Biography
Richardson was born and raised in New Iberia, Louisiana. He began his musical career at the age of 16, when he left home to tour the South with local bands. Shortly thereafter Ike Turner, upon hearing Richardson play in Texas, hired him to play with his band, the Kings of Rhythm, and then later with the Ike & Tina Turner Revue. Richardson worked with Turner for the next ten years. His ex-wife Edna Richardson was an Ikette in the revue as well. In 1971, Richardson's arrangement of the Creedence Clearwater Revival song "Proud Mary" reached No. 4 on the pop chart and No. 5 on the R&B chart. It became a signature song for Ike & Tina Turner and won them a Grammy Award for Best R&B Vocal Performance by a Group in 1972.

In 1971, Richardson joined John Mayall's Bluesbreakers, with whom he would tour and record for the next decade, playing with many of the diverse artists to whom Mayall gave a start.

In the mid-1980s, Richardson joined Albert Collins and the Icebreakers and became an influential figure in the Chicago blues scene. He helped earn the Icebreakers the W. C. Handy Award as Blues Band of the Year in 1985.

Over the years Richardson recorded with many other artists, including Pee Wee Crayton, Bobby Womack and the English guitarist Terry Reid, with whom he was recording an album at the time of his death. Though limited by health problems in later years, he continued to perform and record and to sit in on jam sessions with friends. He played his last gig a few weeks before his death, at a club with Reid.

Richardson died in the early hours of January 29, 2004, in his home in Los Angeles, from complications of diabetes. He was 64. He was survived by two daughters, Rosalyn and Dia Richardson, and three grandchildren.

Partial discography

With Ike & Tina Turner
1966: River Deep – Mountain High, Ike & Tina Turner (London Records)
1969: A Black Man's Soul, Ike Turner's Kings of Rhythm (Pompeii Records)
1971: What You Hear is What You Get, Ike & Tina Turner (United Artists Records)
1972: Strange Fruit, Family Vibes (United Artists Records)
1991: Proud Mary: The Best of Ike & Tina Turner (EMI)

With John Mayall and the Bluesbreakers
1974: The Latest Edition (Polydor)
1975: New Year, New Band, New Company (ABC/One Way)
1975: Notice to Appear (ABC/One Way)
1976: Banquet in Blues (ABC/One Way)
1977: A Hard Core Package (ABC/One Way)
1978: Last of the British Blues (ABC/OneWay), live recording
1982: Road Show Blues (DJM)

With Albert Collins
1988: In Concert (MVD), live DVD
1991: Iceman (Virgin)

Various others
1992: Guitars That Rule the World, various artists (Metal Blade)
1994: Chess Rhythm & Roll, various artists (Chess)
2003: Anthology, Bobby Womack (The Right Stuff)

References

External links
Life in Legacy - Week of February 7, 2004 picture of Soko Richardson

1939 births
2004 deaths
People from New Iberia, Louisiana
American rock drummers
Blues drummers
Ike & Tina Turner members
Rhythm and blues drummers
John Mayall & the Bluesbreakers members
Soul drummers
Musicians from Louisiana
Deaths from diabetes
Kings of Rhythm members
20th-century American drummers
American male drummers
20th-century American male musicians